Dropping in is a skateboarding trick with which a skateboarder starts skating a half-pipe by dropping into it from the coping instead of starting from the bottom and pumping gradually for more speed. When a skateboarder drops in, they use their gravitational potential energy to gain initial velocity, allowing the skater to skate longer before exhausting themselves and thus to take more runs.

When a skateboarder drops in, they stand on the deck of a half-pipe, put their back foot on the tail of the skateboard, and push it so that the back wheels just roll over the coping into a position like in a tail stall. They then put their front foot on the deck, which now hangs over the half-pipe, lean forward, and start skating the half-pipe.

Gallery of skateboarders dropping in

References

Skateboarding tricks